Mark Blundell (born 8 April 1966) is a British racing driver who competed in Formula One for four seasons, sports cars, and CART. He won the 1992 24 Hours of Le Mans. He was a Formula One presenter for the British broadcaster ITV until the end of the 2008 season when the TV broadcasting rights switched to the BBC. Blundell returned to the track in 2019, driving in the Kwik Fit British Touring Car Championship for the Trade Price Cars team.

Background
Blundell was born in Barnet, London.  He first dabbled in motor sport at the age of 14, racing motocross bikes across England. At the age of 17 he made the switch to four wheels, starting his driving career in Formula Ford. In his first season he placed second in both British Junior Formula Ford Championships. The following year, Blundell won both the Esso British and Snetterton Formula Ford 1600 crowns. The next year, he began racing in the more powerful Formula Ford 2000 category, and won the BBC Grandstand series. He returned to FF1600 to compete in the European Championship racing, taking pole, and finishing fourth overall. In 1986, he won another championship in Formula Ford 2000, this time the European title.

In 1987, Blundell moved on to racing in Formula 3000 and started a number of Formula Three races for TOM'S-Toyota. 1988 brought a switch to the works Lola team in F3000. Blundell completed the season in sixth place.

Formula One
Blundell signed with the sports car team at Nissan for 1989, landing a factory seat. He also managed a test drive with Williams F1 Team. By 1990, Blundell left F3000 to concentrate on sports cars. That same year, he earned pole position at the 24 Hours of Le Mans race driving a Nissan R90CK.  Blundell became the youngest driver to achieve pole position at the Le Mans 24 Hours, with a 6.040-second margin ahead of second place.

1991 marked Blundell's transition into Formula One. His debut season saw a sixth place in Belgium with the Brabham Yamaha team while also maintaining his testing deal with Williams. However, the following season, he was not retained by Brabham, and was left without a race seat in Formula One. He declined Williams' offer to stay on as their test driver for 1992, as he had his eyes solely on a full-time race seat. He told his contemporary Damon Hill about the vacant Williams test seat, which Hill eventually took. Having failed to land a drive for 1992, Blundell eventually signed a testing deal with McLaren. Whilst being a full-time tester for McLaren, he also continued to race sports cars. That year, with the factory Peugeot outfit, he won the Le Mans 24 Hours, adding to his earlier pole.

Blundell returned to Formula One in 1993. A drive with Ligier netted him his first two podium finishes in South Africa and Germany, and tenth in the final World Championship standings. It was a one-year deal with Ligier, however, and in 1994 Blundell signed with Tyrrell. Blundell managed only one podium finish in the 1994 Spanish Grand Prix, which was the last Formula One podium finish for Tyrrell. At the end of the season, owing to lack of sponsorship, Tyrrell released Blundell as the retirement of Nigel Mansell meant a return to McLaren, this time, in a race seat. Teamed with future two-time world champion Mika Häkkinen, Blundell recorded five points finishes and once again took tenth in the final standings. 1995 also saw continued success in sports cars with a fourth place showing in Le Mans, but was Blundell's final year in Formula One, owing to the signing of David Coulthard by McLaren.

Blundell achieved 3 podiums, and scored a total of 32 championship points.

Blundell came close to making a return to Formula One in 2001. He had advanced negotiations with Prost Grand Prix to be the team's test and development driver but the deal was not concluded.

CART

Out of Formula One, Blundell moved to the United States and joined the CART racing team PacWest, alongside fellow former Formula One driver Maurício Gugelmin. Early in the season, Blundell crashed head-on into a concrete wall in Rio, resulting in a broken foot and ankle and forcing him to miss three races. Despite this, he was third in the rookie standings with three top six finishes in the U.S. 500, Detroit Grand Prix, and Michigan International Speedway races.

In 1997 Blundell came within one corner of winning the Detroit Belle Isle Grand Prix before running out of fuel, an event he described at the time as the worst disappointment of his career. In the next race, he passed Gil de Ferran on the final straight to win the Grand Prix of Portland by 0.027 seconds. Blundell recorded further race victories in Toronto and Fontana en route to sixth in the championship. That year he was also named British Driver of the Year by Autosport magazine.

A crash whilst testing at Gateway in early 1999 left Blundell to miss 8 races in the middle of the 1999 season. He returned to PacWest for a final season in 2000. However, after finishing 21st in the championship with 18 points, he left PacWest racing by mutual agreement.

From driving to commentating

Blundell again crossed the Atlantic to focus on his sports car racing. He failed to finish Le Mans with the MG Lola team, though he and his teammates impressed. Off-track, Blundell joined ITV television in Britain as an analyst for the 2002 Formula One season. This position lasted until the end of the 2008 Formula One season when ITV lost coverage to the BBC.

Since 2001, Blundell's racing involvement has steadily declined, with only the occasional event. He did test a Dale Coyne Champ Car to help prepare Darren Manning for a one-off in the first CART race in Britain at Rockingham, and raced in the British round of the World Rally Championship. In 2003, along with Johnny Herbert and David Brabham, he finished second at the 24 Hours of Le Mans, completing a 1–2 sweep by Bentley. In 2003 he finished third at the 12 Hours of Sebring driving for Bentley alongside Johnny Herbert and David Brabham.

From 2004, Blundell ran a management company, 2MB Sports Management, with fellow ex-F1 driver and friend Martin Brundle, until Brundle decided to devote more time to his television career. The company represent drivers including McLaren test driver Gary Paffett, British Formula 3 champion and IndyCar driver Mike Conway, Ferrari junior Callum Ilott, BMW backed racer Tom Blomqvist, IndyCar driver Jordan King, British F4 champion Kiern Jewiss and British GT driver Patrick Kibble.

Helmet
Blundell's helmet is yellow with three red stripes and two yellow gaps in the middle, a blue stripe in the entire chin area and a blue circle on the top with his golden initials on it. The rear of his helmet bears the motto "The Will To Win" – a quote from his grandfather.

Racing record

Career summary

† As Blundell was a guest driver, he was ineligible for championship points.

Complete International Formula 3000 results
(key)

Complete Japanese Formula 3000 Championship results
(key)

Complete 24 Hours of Le Mans results

Complete Formula One results
(key)

Complete CART results
(key)

Complete WRC results

Complete American Le Mans Series results

Complete British Touring Car Championship results
(key) Races in bold indicate pole position (1 point awarded – 2002–2003 all races, 2004–present just in first race) Races in italics indicate fastest lap (1 point awarded all races) * signifies that driver lead race for at least one lap (1 point awarded – 2002 just in feature races, 2003–present all races)

References

External links

Official Website
Mark Blundell at itv.com
Mark 'git orf me barra' Blundell at www.planet-f1.com

1966 births
English racing drivers
English Formula One drivers
Brabham Formula One drivers
Ligier Formula One drivers
Tyrrell Formula One drivers
McLaren Formula One drivers
Japanese Formula 3000 Championship drivers
English male journalists
Living people
Champ Car drivers
24 Hours of Le Mans drivers
24 Hours of Le Mans winning drivers
People from Chipping Barnet
International Formula 3000 drivers
24 Hours of Daytona drivers
World Sportscar Championship drivers
British GT Championship drivers
Blancpain Endurance Series drivers
24 Hours of Spa drivers
British Touring Car Championship drivers
Peugeot Sport drivers
Nismo drivers
PacWest Racing drivers
TOM'S drivers
United Autosports drivers
Meyer Shank Racing drivers
Nürburgring 24 Hours drivers
Volkswagen Motorsport drivers